Glan-yr-afon is a hamlet in the community of Bodffordd, Ynys Môn, Wales, which is 135 miles (217.3 km) from Cardiff and 218.1 miles (351 km) from London.

References

See also 
 List of localities in Wales by population

Villages in Anglesey